Ezekiel 24 is the twenty-fourth chapter of the Book of Ezekiel in the Hebrew Bible or the Old Testament of the Christian Bible. This book is attributed to the prophet/priest Ezekiel, and is one of the Books of the Prophets. This chapter contains Ezekiel's "last oracle against Jerusalem".

Text
The original text of this chapter was written in the Hebrew language. This chapter is divided into 27 verses.

Textual witnesses
In the Hebrew Masoretic tradition, some early manuscripts which contain the text of this chapter are the Codex Cairensis, Aleppo Codex (10th century), and Leningrad Codex (1008-1009). Fragments containing parts of this chapter were found among the Dead Sea Scrolls, that is, 4Q75 (4QEzek; 100–50 BCE) with extant verses 2–3.

There is also a translation into Koine Greek known as the Septuagint, made in the last few centuries BC. Extant ancient manuscripts of the Septuagint version include Codex Vaticanus (B; B; 4th century), Codex Alexandrinus (A; A; 5th century) and Codex Marchalianus (Q; Q; 6th century). There are a number of places in this chapter where the Septuagint text lacks wording present in the Hebrew texts.

Verse 1
 Again, in the ninth year, in the tenth month, on the tenth day of the month,
 the word of the Lord came to me, saying, (NKJV)
Cross reference: ; ; 
 "The tenth month" (of the ecclesiastical year on the Hebrew calendar): Tevet. The date corresponds to January 5, 587 BCE, based on the analysis by theologian Bernhard Lang, or 588 BCE, in the New Oxford Annotated Bible.

Verse 2
 "Son of man, write thee the name of the day, even of this same day:
 the king of Babylon set himself against Jerusalem this same day." (KJV)
 "Son of man" (Hebrew: בן־אדם -): this phrase is used 93 times to address Ezekiel.
 "Set" (Hebrew: סָמַ֤ךְ ): translated "started his siege" (NKJV); "has laid siege" (NIV); "drew close" (ASV). The Hebrew verb means "lean", "lay", "rest", "support", in the sense of "to place or lay something upon any thing, so that it may rest upon, and be supported by it" or "to lay hand on any thing, so as to lean upon the hand."

Verses 15-27
On the death of his wife, the prophet abstains from all mourning, providing "a sign of the silent stupefaction which the news of the city’s fall will occasion".

Verse 24
 "Thus Ezekiel is a sign to you; according to all that he has done you shall do;
 and when this comes, you shall know that I am the Lord God." (NKJV)
 "When this comes": medieval commentator Rashi interprets "this" as "the evil".

See also

Babylon
Ezekiel
Jerusalem
Tevet
Related Bible parts: 2 Kings 25, Jeremiah 39, Jeremiah 52, Ezekiel 11, 2 Corinthians 1

Notes

References

Sources

External links

Jewish
Ezekiel 24 Hebrew with Parallel English
Ezekiel 24 Hebrew with Rashi's Commentary

Christian
Ezekiel 24 English Translation with Parallel Latin Vulgate

24